
Jules Horne (born 1963) is a Scottish playwright, radio dramatist and fiction writer.

Jules Horne was born in Hawick, Scotland, and lived in Bonn, Bern and Reading before returning to the Scottish Borders. Following a German degree at Oxford, she worked in Germany and Switzerland as a translator, editor and BBC radio journalist. She returned to the UK in 2000 to write full-time.

Jules was awarded a Scottish Arts Council Bursary in 2001 and the National Library of Scotland Robert Louis Stevenson Memorial Award in 2002.

Her first full-length play, Gorgeous Avatar, was performed by the Traverse Theatre, Edinburgh in 2006, and in Japanese at AI Hall, Itami, Osaka in 2007, and by Heidelberg University's Schauspielgruppe Anglistik in 2008. Plays for radio include Left at the Lights (BBC Radio Scotland), Inner Critic (BBC 7), A Place in the Rain (BBC Radio 4), Overdue South (BBC Radio Scotland), Life: An Audio Tour (BBC Radio 4), Small Blue Thing (BBC Radio Scotland) and Macmillan's Marvellous Motion Machine (BBC Radio 4). She was the Scottish Arts Council's Virtual Writing Fellow for Dumfries and Galloway from 2005–2008, and has taught playwriting in schools as part of the Traverse's Class Act project. She teaches creative writing as an Associate Lecturer at Open University.

Her play Allotment for Nutshell Theatre won a Scotsman Fringe First at the 2011 Edinburgh Festival Fringe, and the 2011 Fringe Award by the Centre for Sustainable Practice in the Arts.

Radio Plays

Theatre
{| class="wikitable sortable" cellpadding="4" style="font-size: 100%; border:2; background: #f9f9f9"
|- align="center"
! colspan=7 style="background:#B0C4DE;" | Stage plays written by Jules Horne
|- align="center"
! Date !! Title !! Director !! class="unsortable" | Cast !! class="unsortable" | Synopsis !! Company / Theatre !! class="unsortable" | Notes

|- id="Borders Fusion: Pawkie Paitterson's Auld Grey Yaud"
|  – 
| rowspan=2 | Borders Fusion: Pawkie Paitterson's Auld Grey Yaud
| rowspan=2 | 
| rowspan=2 | Simon Crouch, Matthew Burgess and Kathleen Quinn
| rowspan=2 | Based on a traditional poem, which finds an ageing horse setting out its last will and testament.
| Cross Country Theatre Company

| rowspan=2 |
|-
|  – 
| Traverse Theatre, Edinburgh
|- id="Bill McLaren Was My PE Teacher"
|  – 
| Bill McLaren Was My PE Teacher
| 
|
|
| Rowan Tree Theatre
|
|- id="Gorgeous Avatar"
|  – 
| rowspan=2 | Gorgeous Avatar
| rowspan=2 | 
| rowspan=2 | Pauline Knowles, Una McLean, Patrick Hoffman and John Kazek
| rowspan=2 | Amy enjoys her isolation in a small Borders town, glued to her laptop and conducting her work, shopping and a long-distance relationship via the internet – but the real world catches up with her when her American internet beau gets on a plane to visit.
| Traverse Theatre, Edinburgh
| rowspan=2 |
|-
|  – 
|

|- id="Overdue South"
|  – 
| Overdue South
| 
| Eileen McCallum, Louise Ludgate and Billy Riddoch
|
| Traverse Theatre, Edinburgh
|
|- id="The Devil on Wheels"
|  – 
| 
| 
| Fraser Boyle
| Monologue celebrating the life and heritage of Kirkpatrick Macmillan, the Dumfriesshire blacksmith who invented the pedal bicycle, centres on Macmillan's appearance in a Glasgow court where he was charged with dangerous driving and knocking down a young girl while riding his new pedal bicycle through the Gorbals in 1842.
| Nutshell Theatre

| Created for the Scottish Forestry Commission for The World Mountain Bike Conference and Original Bicycle Festival
|- id="The Wife of Usher's Well"
|  – 
| 
| 
| Helen Longworth, Danny Kennedy, Andrew Whitehead and Ruth Tapp
|
| Quondam Theatre

| Supported by Arts Council England
|- id="Allotment"
|  – 
| Allotment
| 
| Pauline Goldsmith and Nicola Jo Cully
|
| Nutshell Theatre / Assembly: Inverleith Allotments, Edinburgh
|
|- id="Thread"
|  – 
| rowspan="2" | Thread<ref>[https://www.scotsman.com/arts-and-culture/theatre-and-stage/theatre-review-thread-assembly-st-marks-1612744 Theatre review: Thread; Assembly St Mark's' – Emma Hay, The Scotsman, 16 August 2012]</ref>Life in a nutshell – Thom Dibdin, All Edinburgh Theatre, 24 September 2013
| rowspan="2" | 
| Mary Gapinski, Claire Dargo and Stephen Docherty
| rowspan="2" | 
| Nutshell Theatre
| rowspan="2" | 
|- id="Thread (tour)"
|  – 
| Gowan Calder, Nicola Jo Cully and Stephen Docherty
| 

|- id="Handfast"
| 
| rowspan="3" | HandfastHandfast – Nutshell TheatreReview: Handfast by Nutshell Theatre – David Pollock, Fest, 5 August 2018Edinburgh Fringe 2018: Handfast – by Jenni Davidson, Fringe Review, 17 August 2018
| rowspan="3" | 
| Nicola Jo Cully, Joanna Holden, Robin Laing, Victoria Liddelle, Sandy Nelson and Mark McDonnell
| rowspan="3" | 
| Nutshell Theatre
MacArts Centre, Galashiels
| Performed script-in-hand as a work-in-progress, the first time the play was heard by an audience.
|- id="Handfast (St Andrews)"
|  – 
| rowspan="2" | Joanna Holden, Stephen Doherty, Pauline Goldsmith, Sandy Nelson, Mary Gapinski and Valentine Hanson 
| Nutshell Theatre & The Byre Theatre
The Byre Theatre, St Andrews
| rowspan="2" | 
|- id="Handfast (Edinburgh)"
|  – 
| Nutshell Theatre & The Byre Theatre
Summerhall, Edinburgh
|-

|}

Short stories
 Agnus Dei, Macalllan Shorts 1 Polygon, 1998 
 Life Kit #1, Franklin's Grace Fish, 2002 
 Radar Bird, Macallan Shorts V, Polygon, 2003 
 The Case Against Wings, Chapman 2004 
 Nanonovels, Product magazine, 2004–2008 ISSN 1468-9901
 Bill McLaren Was My PE Teacher''

Journalism
 Open University learning is a joy – Jules Horne, The Guardian, 18 June 2010

References

Alumni of the University of Oxford
Living people
People from Hawick
Scottish dramatists and playwrights
Scottish radio writers
Scottish short story writers
1963 births